The Israel women's national under-20 basketball team is a national basketball team of Israel, administered by the Israel Basketball Association.
It represents the country in women's international under-20 basketball competitions.

FIBA U20 Women's European Championship

References

External links
Archived records of Israel team participations

Basketball in Israel
Basketball teams in Israel
Women's national under-20 basketball teams
B